Nikku Madhusudhan is a Professor of Astrophysics and Exoplanetary Science at the Institute of Astronomy, University of Cambridge. He is credited with developing the technique of atmospheric retrieval to infer the compositions of exoplanets.

Education
Madhusudhan obtained a B. Tech at Indian Institute of Technology (BHU) Varanasi before pursuing an MS and PhD at MIT. His doctoral advisor was Sara Seager.

Research
During his PhD, Madhusudhan developed a method for inferring the composition and temperature structure of exoplanet atmospheres known as atmospheric retrieval, which is widely used today. In 2012, Madhusudhan showed that the mass and radius of the super-Earth 55 Cancri e was consistent with a carbon-rich interior. In 2014, he led a team which obtained high-precision measurements of the atmospheric water abundances of three hot Jupiters, finding less water than would be expected given planet formation models at the time. Madhusudhan was part of a team that detected titanium oxide in the atmosphere of the planet WASP-19b. In 2020, Madhusudhan led a team who studied the interior and atmosphere of the mini-Neptune exoplanet K2-18b. They found that in certain cases, liquid water may exist on the planet's surface, albeit at temperatures and pressures higher than STP.

References 

Year of birth missing (living people)
Living people